Fittipaldi may refer to:

People
 Rafael Fittipaldi, designer of the 1914 Fittipaldi machine gun

Fittipaldi racing family
 Wilson Fittipaldi (Senior), a Brazilian motorsport journalist and founder of the Mil Milhas Brasil race
 His elder son Wilson Fittipaldi Júnior, a race car driver. Emerson's elder brother and Christian's father
 Christian Fittipaldi, a race car driver, Wilson Júnior's son
 Wilson Sr's younger son Emerson Fittipaldi, two-time Formula One Champion and Indianapolis 500 winner
 Enzo Fittipaldi, a racing driver, Emerson's grandson and Pietro's brother
 Pietro Fittipaldi, a racing driver, Emerson's grandson and Enzo's brother

Sports
 Emerson Fittipaldi Speedway, Autódromo Internacional Nelson Piquet, Jacarepaguá, Rio de Janeiro, Brazil; a trapezoidal oval racetrack within the autodrome facility

Fittipaldi racing family auto racing motorsport teams
 Team Fittipaldi, a 1970s racing team sponsored by Bardahl
 Fittipaldi Automotive, a Formula One team owned by brothers Wilson Júnior and Emerson
 Fittipaldi-Dingman Racing, a 2003 CART season team, owned by Emerson and James Dingman

Other uses
 Fittipaldi Motors LLC, a car company of Emerson Fittipaldi
 Fittipaldi machine gun, recoil-operated, patented 1914 by Rafael Fittipaldi

See also